
Guang'anmen, also known as the , Guangningmen and Zhangyimen, was a city gate of old Beijing, constructed during the reign of the Jiajing Emperor (1521–1567) of the Ming Dynasty. This gate was part of Beijing's city wall, situated south-west of the city center and facing east. Guang'anmen served as a main entrance to Beijing.

History
The Records of the Capital at Yan , written by the Qing historian Gu Sen  read: "Of the seven outer city gates, the one facing east is called Guangningmen. 15 li to the west of the gate is Lugou Bridge; if you cross the bridge and continue 20li, you will find the seat of Liangxiang County. The gate is a strategic passage for ground traffic from the southern provinces and is of vital importance." 

The Guanganmen Incident of 26 July 1937 was part of the Second Sino-Japanese War, the Chinese theatre of World War II. This ultimately resulted in the retreat of Chinese armies to the southern provinces, the fall of Beijing and Tianjing, and the Japanese occupation of the entire North China Plain later that year.

The gate was torn down for construction of Beijing's 2nd Ring Road, which led to the demolition of most of Beijing city fortifications.

Etymology
Guang'anmen was known as "Guangningmen" during the Ming and early Qing Dynasty. It was renamed by the Daoguang Emperor, whose private name was Minning. Because the Chinese naming taboo forbid the use of characters in the given name of ancestors and emperors, the name was changed to a close synonym.

Neighbourhood
Guang'anmen is now the name of a Beijing neighbourhood in Xicheng District. After the completion of Guang'an Avenue  one of the main traffic arteries of modern Beijing, the area has become an important business district. It is also home to a few prestigious education institutes, including Central Conservatory of Music, Beijing Primary School  and Beijing No.14 High School  

Line 7 of the Beijing Subway passes underneath Guang'an Avenue.  The neighbourhood is also served by many public bus lines.

See also
Beijing city fortifications
Xicheng District

Notes

References

Gates of Beijing
Neighbourhoods of Beijing
Road transport in Beijing
Xicheng District
Demolished buildings and structures in China